The 36th Motor Rifle Division was a motorized infantry division of the Soviet Army between 1966 and 1990. Based in Artemivsk, it was absorbed by the 254th Motor Rifle Division in 1990.

History 
The division was activated on 20 June 1966 in Artemivsk, Donetsk Oblast, part of the Kiev Military District. In 1972, the division's Chemical Defence Company was renamed the 19th Separate Chemical Defence Battalion. In April 1982, the division became part of the 64th Army Corps. In July 1989, the corps was disbanded and the 36th became part of the Kiev Military District again. During the Cold War, the division was maintained at 15% strength. In January 1990, the division was disbanded and was absorbed by the 254th Motor Rifle Division, arriving from Hungary.

Composition 
The division included the following units in 1988.
 103rd Motor Rifle Regiment 
 142nd Motor Rifle Regiment 
 143rd Motor Rifle Regiment 
 35th Tank Regiment
 Artillery Regiment 
 Anti-Aircraft Missile Regiment 
 Separate Missile Battalion 
 Separate Anti-Tank Artillery Battalion 
 Separate Reconnaissance Battalion 
 Separate Engineer-Sapper Battalion
 1179th Separate Communications Battalion 
 19th Separate Chemical Defence Battalion
 Separate Equipment Maintenance and Recovery Battalion 
 199th Separate Medical Company 
 Separate Material Supply Battalion

References 

Motor rifle divisions of the Soviet Union
Military units and formations established in 1966
Military units and formations disestablished in 1990